The Chandrasekhar limit is the maximum mass of a stable white dwarf star.

White dwarfs resist gravitational collapse primarily through electron degeneracy pressure, compared to main sequence stars, which resist collapse through thermal pressure. The Chandrasekhar limit is the mass above which electron degeneracy pressure in the star's core is insufficient to balance the star's own gravitational self-attraction.  Consequently, a white dwarf with a mass greater than the limit is subject to further gravitational collapse, evolving into a different type of stellar remnant, such as a neutron star or black hole.  Those with masses up to the limit remain stable as white dwarfs. Tolman–Oppenheimer–Volkoff limit is theoretically a next level to reach in order for a neutron star to collapse into a denser form such as a black hole.

The limit was named after Subrahmanyan Chandrasekhar. Chandrasekhar improved upon the accuracy of the calculation in 1930 by calculating the limit for a polytrope model of a star in hydrostatic equilibrium, and comparing his limit to the earlier limit found by E. C. Stoner for a  uniform density star.  Importantly, the existence of a limit, based on the conceptual breakthrough of  combining relativity with  Fermi degeneracy, was indeed first established  in separate  papers published by Wilhelm Anderson and E. C. Stoner in 1929.  The limit was initially ignored by the community of scientists because such a limit would logically require the existence of black holes, which were considered a scientific impossibility at the time. The fact that the roles of Stoner and Anderson are often overlooked in the astronomy community has been noted.

Physics

Electron degeneracy pressure is a quantum-mechanical effect arising from the Pauli exclusion principle. Since electrons are fermions, no two electrons can be in the same state, so not all electrons can be in the minimum-energy level. Rather, electrons must occupy a band of energy levels. Compression of the electron gas increases the number of electrons in a given volume and raises the maximum energy level in the occupied band. Therefore, the energy of the electrons increases on compression, so pressure must be exerted on the electron gas to compress it, producing electron degeneracy pressure. With sufficient compression, electrons are forced into nuclei in the process of electron capture, relieving the pressure.

Solving the hydrostatic equation leads to a model white dwarf that is a polytrope of index  – and therefore has radius inversely proportional to the cube root of its mass, and volume inversely proportional to its mass.

As the mass of a model white dwarf increases, the typical energies to which degeneracy pressure forces the electrons are no longer negligible relative to their rest masses. The velocities of the electrons approach the speed of light, and special relativity must be taken into account. In the strongly relativistic limit, the equation of state takes the form .

This is the Chandrasekhar limit. The curves of radius against mass for the non-relativistic and relativistic models are shown in the graph. They are colored blue and green, respectively.  has been set equal to 2. Radius is measured in standard solar radii or kilometers, and mass in standard solar masses.

Calculated values for the limit vary depending on the nuclear composition of the mass.  Chandrasekhar, eq. (36),, eq. (58),, eq. (43) gives the following expression, based on the equation of state for an ideal Fermi gas:

where:
 is the reduced Planck constant
 is the speed of light
 is the gravitational constant
 is the average molecular weight per electron, which depends upon the chemical composition of the star
 is the mass of the hydrogen atom
 is a constant connected with the solution to the Lane–Emden equation
As  is the Planck mass, the limit is of the order of

The limiting mass can be obtained formally from the Chandrasekhar's white dwarf equation by taking the limit of large central density.

A more accurate value of the limit than that given by this simple model requires adjusting for various factors, including electrostatic interactions between the electrons and nuclei and effects caused by nonzero temperature. Lieb and Yau have given a rigorous derivation of the limit from a relativistic many-particle Schrödinger equation.

History
In 1926, the British physicist Ralph H. Fowler observed that the relationship between the density, energy, and temperature of white dwarfs could be explained  by viewing them as a gas of nonrelativistic, non-interacting electrons and nuclei that obey Fermi–Dirac statistics. This Fermi gas model was then used by the British physicist Edmund Clifton Stoner in 1929 to calculate the relationship among the mass, radius, and density of white dwarfs, assuming they were homogeneous spheres. Stoner went on to derive the pressure–density equation of state, which he published in 1932. These equations of state were also previously published by the Soviet physicist Yakov Frenkel in 1928, together with some other remarks on the physics of degenerate matter. Frenkel's work, however, was ignored by the astronomical and astrophysical community.

A series of papers published between 1931 and 1935 had its beginning on a trip from India to England in 1930, where the Indian physicist Subrahmanyan Chandrasekhar worked on the calculation of the statistics of a degenerate Fermi gas. In these papers, Chandrasekhar solved the hydrostatic equation together with the nonrelativistic Fermi gas equation of state, and also treated the case of a relativistic Fermi gas, giving rise to the value of the limit shown above.  Chandrasekhar reviews this work in his Nobel Prize lecture.  This value was also computed in 1932 by the Soviet physicist Lev Landau, who, however, did not apply it to white dwarfs and concluded that quantum laws might be invalid for stars heavier than 1.5 solar mass.

Chandrasekhar's work on the limit aroused controversy, owing to the opposition of the British astrophysicist Arthur Eddington. Eddington was aware that the existence of black holes was theoretically possible, and also realized that the existence of the limit made their formation possible. However, he was unwilling to accept that this could happen. After a talk by Chandrasekhar on the limit in 1935, he replied:

Eddington's proposed solution to the perceived problem was to modify relativistic mechanics so as to make the law  universally applicable, even for large .  Although Niels Bohr, Fowler, Wolfgang Pauli, and other physicists agreed with Chandrasekhar's analysis, at the time, owing to Eddington's status, they were unwilling to publicly support Chandrasekhar., pp. 110–111  Through the rest of his life, Eddington held to his position in his writings, including his work on his fundamental theory.  The drama associated with this disagreement is one of the main themes of Empire of the Stars, Arthur I. Miller's biography of Chandrasekhar.  In Miller's view:

Applications
The core of a star is kept from collapsing by the heat generated by the fusion of nuclei of lighter elements into heavier ones. At various stages of stellar evolution, the nuclei required for this process are exhausted, and the core collapses, causing it to become denser and hotter. A critical situation arises when iron accumulates in the core, since iron nuclei are incapable of generating further energy through fusion. If the core becomes sufficiently dense, electron degeneracy pressure will play a significant part in stabilizing it against gravitational collapse.

If a main-sequence star is not too massive (less than approximately 8 solar masses), it eventually sheds enough mass to form a white dwarf having mass below the Chandrasekhar limit, which consists of the former core of the star. For more-massive stars, electron degeneracy pressure does not keep the iron core from collapsing to very great density, leading to formation of a neutron star, black hole, or, speculatively, a quark star.  (For very massive, low-metallicity stars, it is also possible that instabilities destroy the star completely.) During the collapse, neutrons are formed by the capture of electrons by protons in the process of electron capture, leading to the emission of neutrinos., pp. 1046–1047. The decrease in gravitational potential energy of the collapsing core releases a large amount of energy on the order of 1046 joules (100 foes). Most of this energy is carried away by the emitted neutrinos and the kinetic energy of the expanding shell of gas; only about 1% is emitted as optical light. This process is believed responsible for supernovae of types Ib, Ic, and II.

Type Ia supernovae derive their energy from runaway fusion of the nuclei in the interior of a white dwarf. This fate may befall carbon–oxygen white dwarfs that accrete matter from a companion giant star, leading to a steadily increasing mass. As the white dwarf's mass approaches the Chandrasekhar limit, its central density increases, and, as a result of compressional heating, its temperature also increases. This eventually ignites nuclear fusion reactions, leading to an immediate carbon detonation, which disrupts the star and causes the supernova., §5.1.2

A strong indication of the reliability of Chandrasekhar's formula is that the absolute magnitudes of supernovae of Type Ia are all approximately the same; at maximum luminosity,  is approximately −19.3, with a standard deviation of no more than 0.3., (1)  A 1-sigma interval therefore represents a factor of less than 2 in luminosity. This seems to indicate that all type Ia supernovae convert approximately the same amount of mass to energy.

Super-Chandrasekhar mass supernovas

In April 2003, the Supernova Legacy Survey observed a type Ia supernova, designated SNLS-03D3bb, in a galaxy approximately 4 billion light years away. According to a group of astronomers at the University of Toronto and elsewhere, the observations of this supernova are best explained by assuming that it arose from a white dwarf that had grown to twice the mass of the Sun before exploding. They believe that the star, dubbed the "Champagne Supernova" may have been spinning so fast that a centrifugal tendency allowed it to exceed the limit. Alternatively, the supernova may have resulted from the merger of two white dwarfs, so that the limit was only violated momentarily. Nevertheless, they point out that this observation poses a challenge to the use of type Ia supernovae as standard candles.

Since the observation of the Champagne Supernova in 2003, several more type Ia supernovae have been observed that are very bright, and thought to have originated from white dwarfs whose masses exceeded the Chandrasekhar limit. These include SN 2006gz, SN 2007if, and SN 2009dc. The super-Chandrasekhar mass white dwarfs that gave rise to these supernovae are believed to have had masses up to 2.4–2.8 solar masses. One way to potentially explain the problem of the Champagne Supernova was considering it the result of an aspherical explosion of a white dwarf. However, spectropolarimetric observations of SN 2009dc showed it had a polarization smaller than 0.3, making the large asphericity theory unlikely.

Tolman–Oppenheimer–Volkoff limit

After a supernova explosion, a neutron star may be left behind (except Ia type supernova explosion, which never leaves any remnants behind). These objects are even more compact than white dwarfs and are also supported, in part, by degeneracy pressure. A neutron star, however, is so massive and compressed that electrons and protons have combined to form neutrons, and the star is thus supported by neutron degeneracy pressure (as well as short-range repulsive neutron-neutron interactions mediated by the strong force) instead of electron degeneracy pressure.  The limiting value for neutron star mass, analogous to the Chandrasekhar limit, is known as the Tolman–Oppenheimer–Volkoff limit.

See also
Bekenstein bound
Chandrasekhar's white dwarf equation
Schönberg–Chandrasekhar limit

References

Further reading
On Stars, Their Evolution and Their Stability, Nobel Prize lecture, Subrahmanyan Chandrasekhar, December 8, 1983.
White dwarf stars and the Chandrasekhar limit, Masters' thesis, Dave Gentile, DePaul University, 1995.
Estimating Stellar Parameters from Energy Equipartition, sciencebits.com. Discusses how to find mass-radius relations and mass limits for white dwarfs using simple energy arguments.

Astrophysics
White dwarfs
Neutron stars
Stellar dynamics